Patrick Ottmann (born April 21, 1956) is a French former footballer who played as a goalkeeper.

External links
 Profile

1956 births
Living people
People from Bischwiller
French people of German descent
French footballers
RC Strasbourg Alsace players
Ligue 1 players
Association football goalkeepers
Footballers from Alsace
Sportspeople from Bas-Rhin